Christopher Joyce Fernando Javier (born December 6, 1992) is a Filipino professional basketball player who last played for the NorthPort Batang Pier of the Philippine Basketball Association (PBA). He was drafted 5th overall by Star in the 2016 PBA draft.

Early life
The young Javier learned the rudiments of the game of basketball when he participated in a camp held by former PBA player Ed Cordero sometime in 2005. A year later, he was recruited by the San Beda Red Cubs, which he helped win more championships in the high school division of the National Collegiate Athletic Association. When it was time for him to move to college, he planned to enroll at De La Salle University with fellow Red Cub Alfonzo Gotladera but was advised to play elsewhere to avoid playing in the shadow of his teammate.

Collegiate career
Javier played his entire five-year collegiate career for the UE Red Warriors in the University Athletic Association of the Philippines. He posted career averages of 7.1 points and 5.1 rebounds in 22.6 minutes, playing a total of 68 games.

He started turning heads during his sophomore year after averaging 10.6 points and 6.9 rebounds, an improvement from his rookie numbers of 4.6 points and 4.6 rebounds per game. In the same season, he hit back-to-back game winners — first against UP and then against five-peat seeking Ateneo de Manila.

PBA D-League
Javier had an impressive stint with Racal Tile Masters in the PBA D-League.

Professional career
Javier was drafted fifth overall in the 2016 PBA draft by the Star Hotshots.

On September 10, 2017, Javier, along with Allein Maliksi, was traded to the Blackwater Elite for Kyle Pascual and Riego Gamalinda.

On September 18, 2020, he signed with the TNT KaTropa. He also had a stint with the team's affiliate 3x3 team, the TNT Tropang Giga, during the 2021 PBA 3x3 season.

On June 3, 2022, he signed with the NorthPort Batang Pier.

Career statistics

PBA season-by-season averages
As of the end of 2022–23 season
|-
| align=left | 
| align=left | Star
| 16 || 4.7 || .364 || .000 || .800 || .6 || .3 || .0 || .2 || 1.3 
|-
| align=left | 
| align=left | Blackwater
| 18 || 6.0 || .455 || .182 || .600 || 1.0 || .3 || .2 || .1 || 1.9
|-
| align=left | 
| align=left | Blackwater
| 20 || 13.1 || .358 || .321 || .708 || 2.4 || .5 || .2 || .2 || 4.2
|-
| align=left | 
| align=left | TNT
| 8 || 3.6 || .400 || .000 || 1.000 || .3 || .0 || .0 || .0 || .8
|-
| align=left | 
| align=left | NorthPort
| 6 || 7.8 || .455 || .286 || – || 1.7 || .2 || .0 || .0 || 2.0
|-class=sortbottom
| align="center" colspan=2 | Career
| 68 || 7.7 || .388 || .245 || .722 || 1.3 || .3 || .1 || .1 || 2.3

College

Elimination rounds 

|-
| align="left" | 2011-12
| align="left" rowspan="5" | UE
| 14 || 20.6 || .397 || .000 || .583 || 4.6 || .6 || - || .5 || 4.6
|-
| align="left" | 2012-13
| 14 || 29.5 || .500 || .100 || .614 || 6.9 || .9 || .2 || .4 || 10.6
|-
| align="left" | 2013-14
| 14 || 17.7 || .403 || .167 || .133 || 3.5 || .4 || - || .4 || 4.5
|-
| align="left" | 2014-15
| 14 || 21.0 || .435 || .000 || .688 || 4.0 || .8 || .2 || .4 || 6.1
|-
| align="left" | 2015-16
| 13 || 24.4 || .456 || .000 || .700 || 6.6 || .8 || .1 || 1.5 || 11.2
|-class=sortbottom
| align="center" colspan=2 | Career
| 69 || 22.6 || .425 || .182 || .581 || 5.1 || .7 || .1 || .6 || 7.3

Playoffs 

|-
| align="left" | 2014-15
| align="left" | UE
| 1 || 19.4 || .333 || .000 || .500 || 3.0 || - || - || - || 5.0
|-class=sortbottom
| align="center" colspan=2 | Career
| 1 || 19.4 || .333 || .000 || .500 || 3.0 || - || - || - || 5.0

International
Javier suited up for the Philippine national team that competed in the 2016 FIBA Asia Challenge in Tehran. He averaged 3.6 points, 0.8 rebound, and 9.1 minutes in the five games that he played.

References

1992 births
Living people
Basketball players from Laguna (province)
Centers (basketball)
Magnolia Hotshots draft picks
Magnolia Hotshots players
People from Biñan
Philippines men's national basketball team players
Filipino men's 3x3 basketball players
Filipino men's basketball players
PBA 3x3 players
Power forwards (basketball)
San Beda University alumni
TNT Tropang Giga players
UE Red Warriors basketball players
NorthPort Batang Pier players